Katherine Marshall  may refer to:
Katherine Tupper Marshall (1882–1978), American actress and writer
Katherine "Kitty" Marshall (1870–1947), British suffragette 
Catherine Marshall (1914–1983), American author
Catherine Marshall (suffragist) (1880–1961), women's suffrage and peace campaigner
Kathryn Marshall (born 1967), Scottish golfer

See also
Cathy Marshall (disambiguation)
Kate Marshall (born 1959), American politician
Marshall (surname)